The Resighini Rancheria, located just south of Klamath, California, is a federally recognized tribe of Yurok people. 

A resident population of 36 persons was reported during the 2000 census.  The 2010 US Census shows a decrease, with a population of 31.  It is entirely surrounded by the Yurok Indian Reservation.

In 1938, the US government purchased 228 acres from a man named Augustus Resighini.  This land became a reservation in 1939.  In 1975, members formed a tribal government that was approved by the Secretary of Interior.

Tribal Government 
The tribal government was formed in 1975 and is headquartered in Klamath, California. They are governed by a democratically elected, five-member Tribal Council. The general membership serves on boards, committees, commission and corporations to assist the Tribal Council.

The current Tribal Council is as follows:

 Chairperson: Fawn Che-gere Murphy
 Vice Chairperson: Moonchay Kari Dowd
 Secretary: Frank Spa-ghe Dowd
 Treasurer: Rhonda Dowd 
 Councilmember: Kathy Dowd

In 2003, the Resighini Rancheria established a tribal court to oversee criminal offenses as well as regulatory procedures regarding fishing and wildlife.

Cultural Life 
Resighini Rancheria tribal members participate in traditional dances such as the Brush Dance, as well as the Jump Dance and White Deer Skin Dance.

The Brush Dance is a ceremony held to heal a sick child or to pray for a long, healthy life for the child.  Families come together around a dance pit, beginning on a Wednesday where the medicine doctor, the child and the child's family begin.  Actual dancing begin on Thursday evening with two dances.  Both females and males dance.

The Jump Dance lasts for 10 days.  The Jump Dance was revived in 1984.  The dance is held to prevent sickness, to bring happiness, and to restore balance in the universe.  The dancers wear elaborate outfits, including headdresses with  70 redheaded woodpecker scalps. In addition to the headdress, the dancers also wear dentalia shell necklaces and a deerskin skirt and they carry a Jump Dance basket in the right hand.

The White Deerskin Dance is generally held around same time as the Jump Dance. Canoes are used to transport dances. It seems dancers carry poles with deer heads draped by deerskins.  This dance provides protection to the people.  This dance was also recently revived.
	
Tribal members also engage in the traditions of storytelling, gathering seaweed, mussels and other marine resources for basket making, and subsistence fishing for salmon, trout and eel and other species.

Fishing Controversy

The Resighini rancheria is completely enclosed within the Yurok reservation.  As a result, fishing conflicts have arisen with the Yurok tribe. The Yurok tribe is the largest in California with 6311 members.  The Yurok tribe claims jurisdiction over Resighini lands and interferes with tribal members’ ability to fish at the Klamath River.  In May 2016, the Yurok tribe filed a federal lawsuit to stop members of the Resighini Rancheria from gillnet fishing off of the Klamath River. According to the Yurok tribe, in 1991, the Hoopa-Yurok Settlement Act divided lands into the Yurok and the Hoopa reservations.  The Resighini Rancheria was offered the option of joining the Yurok tribe in order to have access to Yurok lands and access to fishing.  Instead, the tribal members opted for a $15,000 per person payout.  The Yurok argue that the Resighini gave up their fishing rights when they made this agreement. The Resighini members argue that they retained their fishing rights and that the Yurok are unjustly interfering with their land and water use.  The Yurok further argue that they are in the midst of a massive conservation effort, and the Resighini are interfering in their attempts to save the fish in the Klamath River.

Education
The ranchería is served by the Del Norte County Unified School District.

References

Yurok
Federally recognized tribes in the United States
Native American tribes in California
American Indian reservations in California
Native Americans in Del Norte County, California